Allabogdanite is a very rare phosphide mineral with the chemical formula , found in 1994 in a meteorite. It was described for an occurrence in the Onello meteorite in the Onello River basin, Sakha Republic; Yakutia, Russia; associated with 
taenite, schreibersite,	kamacite, graphite and awaruite. It was named for Russian geologist Alla Bogdanova. 

In a June 2021 study, scientists reported the discovery of terrestrial allabogdanite in a sedimentary formation. It is located in the Negev desert of Israel, just southwest of the Dead Sea.

See also
Glossary of meteoritics
List of minerals
List of minerals named after people

References

Iron minerals
Nickel minerals
Phosphide minerals
Meteorite minerals
Orthorhombic minerals
Minerals in space group 62